Laaksolahti (Finnish) or Dalsvik (Swedish) is a district of Espoo, a city in Finland.

See also 
 Districts of Espoo

Districts of Espoo